Puerto Rico Highway 147 (PR-147) is now the PR-5 in Naranjito, Puerto Rico.

History
The former PR-147 ran from its intersection with PR-164 to former east–west portion of PR-148 (current PR-5), as a bypass to the north part of downtown area. After extending the PR-5 number from Bayamón to Naranjito, the PR-147 numbering was decommissioned, leaving an unsigned portion between PR-5 and PR-164 in the east of downtown.

Major intersections

See also

 List of highways numbered 147

References

External links
 

147
Naranjito, Puerto Rico